The War in Heaven is a 1999 Christian-themed action game. The game is described as Doom-meets-the-Bible and is intended for Christian males 15 and older.

Reception
Mike Musgrove from The Washington Post stated in his review of the game that "There's more activity in Sunday school than in this game"

Sales
The game sold 4,000 copies by March 2000 and later 10,000 copies by October 2000.

References

1999 video games
Christian video games
First-person shooters
Video games about demons
Video games set in hell
Video games developed in the United States
Windows games
Windows-only games